George Varaljay (born 9 March 1941) is a Canadian fencer. He competed in the individual and team épée events at the 1976 Summer Olympics.

References

1941 births
Living people
Canadian male épée fencers
Olympic fencers of Canada
Fencers at the 1976 Summer Olympics
Sportspeople from Budapest